McKean may refer to:

Places
 McKean, Pennsylvania
 McKean County, Pennsylvania
 McKean Island, island in the Phoenix Islands, Republic of Kiribati
 McKean Township (disambiguation)

Other uses
 McKean (surname), people with the surname McKean
 USS McKean, two historical US Naval ships

See also
 McKeen (disambiguation)